Lynn L. Silver is an American born scientist best known for her contributions to the field of antibacterial discovery and development.  With over 30 years of experience in the antibacterial discovery field and over 70 peer reviewed publications, Silver provides insight and advice to the research community on global advisory panels, international collaborations for addressing antibiotic resistance issues.  Silver has published several highly cited reviews in the field of antibacterial discovery.

Education and scientific career 
Silver received her BA in Biology from Brandeis University in 1968  She then went on to graduate research in molecular biology and microbiology at Tufts University, where she was awarded her Ph. D. in 1975. After completing her Ph. D, Silver did postdoctoral research studying DNA replication, an important target for antibacterial interventions, at the University of Geneva in the laboratory of Professor Lucien Caro. She then worked as a Staff Fellow/Senior Staff Fellow at the National Institutes of Health in the laboratory of Dr. Nancy Nossal study the genetics of bacteriophage T4.  Silver was then  hired as a research scientist at Merck Research Laboratories in 1982 where as a senior scientist she became a leading researcher in the discovery of novel antibiotics.

Scientific contributions 
Her extensive research on natural products as templates for antibiotics has made her one of the leading experts in the field as evidenced by her highly cited publications.  She has led multidisciplinary antibacterial discovery and development teams supporting chemical synthetic projects on improved antibacterials, and preclinical evaluation of antibacterial drug candidates. Her research includes seminal contributions in the understanding of the mode of action and mechanism of resistance of inhibitors of lipid A synthesis, DNA replication, cell wall synthesis, protein synthesis, and fatty acid synthesis.  She has contributed to the discovery of new antibacterials to overcome antibiotic resistance and toxicity issues through  modification and optimization of macrolides, glycopeptides, and beta-lactams.  In recognition of her contributions to the field of microbiology, Silver was elected as a fellow of the American Academy of Microbiology in 2018.

Professional activities 

 Editorial Board, Antimicrobial Agents and Chemotherapy
 Scientific Advisory Board, Combating Antibacterial Resistant Bacteria (CARB-X)
 Expert Advisor, Global Antibiotic Research and Development Partnership (GARDP)
 Discovery Expert Advisor, Pew Charitable Trust Shared Platform for Antibiotic Research and Knowledge (SPARK)
 Reviewer on NIH Study Sections

Patent 

 Issued US Patent number 6,221,859 Carbapenem antibacterial compositions and methods of the treatment.  Dorso; Karen L. (Franklin Park, NJ), Jackson; Jesse J. (Howell, NJ), Gill; Charles J. (Beachwood, NJ), Kohler; Joyce (Woodbridge, NJ), Silver; Lynn L. (Westfield, NJ)

Representative publications in peer reviewed journals 
There are over 11000 citations of Silver's publications, and she has an h-index of 38

 Silver, Lynn L. Challenges of Antibacterial Discovery.  Clinical Micro Reviews 2011, 24:71-109.
Theuretzbacher U, Gottwalt S, Beyer P, Butler M, Czaplewski L, Lienhardt C, Moja L, Paul M, Paulin S, Rex JH, Silver LL, Spigelman M, Thwaites GE, Paccaud JP, Harbarth S. Analysis of the clinical antibacterial and antituberculosis pipeline. Lancet Infect Dis. 2019 Feb;19(2):e40-e50. doi: 10.1016/S1473-3099(18)30513-9.
 Tacconelli E, Carrara E, Savoldi A, Harbarth S, Mendelson M, Monnet DL, Pulcini C, Kahlmeter G, Kluytmans J, Carmeli Y, Ouellette M, Outterson K, Patel J, Cavaleri M, Cox EM, Houchens CR, Grayson ML, Hansen P, Singh N, Theuretzbacher U, Magrini N; WHO Pathogens Priority List Working Group. Discovery, research, and development of new antibiotics: the WHO priority list of antibiotic-resistant bacteria and tuberculosis. Lancet Infect Dis. 2018 Mar;18(3):318-327. doi: 10.1016/S1473-3099(17)30753-3. Epub 2017 Dec 21.
 Singh SB, Young K, Silver LL. What is an "ideal" antibiotic? Discovery challenges and path forward..  Biochem Pharmacol. 2017 Jun 1;133:63-73. doi: 10.1016/j.bcp.2017.01.003. Epub 2017 Jan 10.
 Silver LL. A Gestalt approach to Gram-negative entry.  Bioorg Med Chem. 2016 Dec 15;24(24):6379-6389. doi: 10.1016/j.bmc.2016.06.044. Epub 2016 Jun 23
 Silver LL. Appropriate Targets for Antibacterial Drugs. Cold Spring Harb Perspect Med. 2016 Dec 1;6(12).
 Silver LL.  Antibacterials for any target. Nat Biotechnol. 2014 Nov;32(11):1102-4. doi: 10.1038/nbt.3060
 East SP, Silver LL. Multitarget ligands in antibacterial research: progress and opportunities. Expert Opin Drug Discov. 2013 Feb;8(2):143-56. doi: 10.1517/17460441.2013.743991. Epub 2012 Dec 19.
Silver LL. Are natural products still the best source for antibacterial discovery? The bacterial entry factor. Expert Opin Drug Discov. 2008;3(5):487‐500. doi:10.1517/17460441.3.5.487
Young K, Jayasuriya H, Ondeyka JG, et al. Discovery of FabH/FabF inhibitors from natural products. Antimicrob Agents Chemother. 2006;50(2):519‐526.
Ali A, Taylor GE, Ellsworth K, et al. Novel pyrazolo[3,4-d]pyrimidine-based inhibitors of Staphlococcus aureus DNA polymerase III: design, synthesis, and biological evaluation. J Med Chem. 2003;46(10):1824‐1830. doi:10.1021/jm020483c
Silver LL. Novel inhibitors of bacterial cell wall synthesis. Curr Opin Microbiol. 2003;6(5):431‐438. doi:10.1016/j.mib.2003.08.004

References

American women biologists
Living people
Year of birth missing (living people)
Brandeis University alumni
Tufts University School of Medicine alumni